Tusti may refer to several places in Estonia:
Tusti, Saare County, village in Estonia
Tusti, Viljandi County, village in Estonia